Sands Creek is a river in Delaware County, New York. It flows into the West Branch Delaware River by Hancock, New York.

References

Rivers of New York (state)
Rivers of Delaware County, New York
Tributaries of the West Branch Delaware River